The Diocese of Petrolina is a Latin Church ecclesiastical territory or diocese of the Catholic Church in Souther Brazil. It is a suffragan diocese in the ecclesiastical province of the metropolitan Archdiocese of Olinda e Recife.

Its cathedra is in Catedral Sagrado Coração de Jesus e Cristo Rei, dedicated to the Sacred Heart of Christ the King, in the episcopal see of Petrolina in the state of Pernambuco.

History 
 Established on 30 November 1923 as Diocese of Petrolina, on territory split off from the Diocese of Pesqueira (now in the same province)
 Lost territories on 1964.02.15, to establish the Diocese of Floresta, and on 2010.06.16 to establish the Diocese of Salgueiro (both in the same province).

Statistics 
, it pastorally served 350,500 Catholics (83.0% of 422,100 total population) on 16,260 km² in 23 parishes and 2 missions with 25 priests (22 diocesan, 3 religious), 28 lay religious (3 brothers, 25 sisters) and 18 seminarians.

Episcopal Ordinaries 

Bishops of Petrolina 
 Antônio Malan, Salesians (S.D.B.) (born Italy, the only foreign incumbent) (1924.01.03 – death 1931.10.28); previously Titular Bishop of Amisus (1914.05.25 – 1924.01.03) as Bishop-Prelate of Territorial Prelature of Registro do Araguaia (Brazil) (1914.05.25 – 1924.01.03)
 Idílio José Soares (1932.09.16 – 1943.06.12): next Bishop of Santos (Brazil) (1943.06.12 – 1966.11.21), retired as Titular Bishop of Vegesela in Numidia (1966.11.21 – death 1969.12.10)
 Avelar Brandão Vilela (1946.06.13 – 1955.11.05); later Metropolitan Archbishop of Teresina (Brazil) (1955.11.05 – 1971.03.25), Vice-President of National Conference of Bishops of Brazil (1964 – 1968), Second Vice-President of Latin American Episcopal Council (1965 – 1966), President of Latin American Episcopal Council (1966 – 1972), Vice-President of National Conference of Bishops of Brazil (1971 – 1974), Metropolitan Archbishop of São Salvador da Bahia (Brazil) (1971.03.25 – death 1986.12.19), Cardinal-Priest of Ss. Bonifacio ed Alessio (1973.03.05 – 1986.12.19)
 Antônio Campelo de Aragão, S.D.B. (1956.12.18 – retired 1975.02.06), died 1988; previously Titular Bishop of Sesta (1950.06.15 – 1956.12.18) as Auxiliary Bishop of Archdiocese of Cuiaba (Brazil) (1950.06.15 – 1956.12.18)
 Gerardo de Andrade Ponte (1975.02.06 – 1983.12.05): next Bishop of Patos (Brazil) (1983.12.05 – retired 2001.08.08), died 2006
 Paulo Cardoso da Silva, O. Carm. (1984.11.30 – retired 2011.07.27)
 Manoel dos Reis de Farias (2011.07.27 - retired 2017.07.12), previously Bishop of Patos (2001.08.08 – 2011.07.27)
 Francisco Canindé Palhano (2018.01.03 – ...), previously Bishop of Bonfim (Brazil) (2006.07.26 – 2018.01.03).

See also 
 List of Catholic dioceses in Brazil
 Sacred Heart Cathedral, Petrolina

Sources and references 
 GCatholic.org, with Google map; data for all sections
 Catholic Hierarchy

Roman Catholic dioceses in Brazil
Roman Catholic Ecclesiastical Province of Olinda e Recife
Petrolina
Roman Catholic dioceses and prelatures established in the 20th century
Religious organizations established in 1923